Baada also known as "Baad" is a village in the Shiggaon taluk of Haveri district in the Indian state of Karnataka. Baada is the birthplace of Sri Kanaka Dasaru. Baada is located near the famous Bankapura fort.

Demographics
As of 2001 India census, Bada had a population of 1,670 with 850 males and 820 females and 292 Households.

Transport
Baada is southwest of District headquarters Haveri and 20 km from Taluka headquarter Shiggaon. Both the towns are well connected by road and train.

History
Baada is also well known as the birthplace of one of the greatest saints of Hindu religion called Kanaka Dasa

See also
 Kanakagiri
 Kaginele
 Shiggaon
 Byadagi
 Haveri
 Karnataka

References

External links

Villages in Haveri district